Raorchestes akroparallagi (sometimes known as the variable bush frog) is a species of frogs in the family Rhacophoridae.

It is endemic to the Western Ghats, India, where it is known from the states of Kerala and Tamil Nadu. Before its description in 2009, it was confused with Raorchestes femoralis and Raorchestes glandulosus.

Description

It is one of predominantly green Raorchestes. However, the colouration of its dorsum (back) is highly variable even within a single location, from almost uniformly green to various colours and markings. Indeed, its specific name, akroparallagi, is derived from Greek words akro, meaning 'extreme' and parallagi, meaning 'variation'.

Reproduction
Raorchestes akroparallagi has direct development, with all growth inside the egg and no free-swimming tadpole stage. Males attract females with their calls. Mating takes place during the night. A pair in amplexus may move around before settling on a leaf and starting to lay eggs on its upper side. Egg laying takes hours and results in a clutch of 20–41 eggs. There is no parental care.

Habitat
Raorchestes akroparallagi is relatively widespread and occurs in a wide range of habitats and can live in disturbed habitats. It is found in evergreen forests to plantations near forest fringes and in roadside vegetation. IUCN does not considered it threatened.

References

External links

akroparallagi
Endemic fauna of the Western Ghats
Frogs of India
Amphibians described in 2009
Taxa named by Sathyabhama Das Biju